Climate change litigation, also known as climate litigation, is an emerging body of environmental law using legal practice to set case law precedent to further climate change mitigation efforts from public institutions, such as governments and companies.  In the face of slow politics of climate change delaying climate change mitigation, activists and lawyers have increased efforts to use national and international judiciary systems to advance the effort. Climate litigation typically engages in one of five types of legal claims: Constitutional law  (focused on breaches of constitutional rights by the state), administrative law (challenging the merits of administrative decision making), private law (challenging corporations or other organizations for negligence, nuisance, etc., fraud or consumer protection (challenging companies for misrepresenting information about climate impacts), or human rights (claiming that failure to act on climate change fails to protect human rights).

Since the early 2000s, the legal frameworks for combating climate change have increasingly been available through legislation, and an increasing body of court cases have developed an international body of law connecting climate action to legal challenges, related to constitutional law, administrative law, private law, consumer protection law or human rights. Many of the successful cases and approaches have focused on advancing the needs of climate justice and the youth climate movement. Since 2015, there has been a trend in the use of human rights arguments in climate lawsuits.

High-profile climate litigation cases brought against states include Leghari v. Pakistan, Juliana v. United States (both 2015), Urgenda v. The Netherlands (2019), and Neubauer v. Germany (2021)., while Milieudefensie v Royal Dutch Shell (2021) is the highest-profile case against a corporation to date. Investor-owned coal, oil, and gas corporations could be legally and morally liable for climate-related human rights violations, even though political decisions could prevent them from engaging in such violations. Litigations are often carried out via collective pooling of effort and resources such as via organizations like Greenpeace, such as Greenpeace Poland which sued a coal utility and Greenpeace Germany which sued a car manufacturer.

There is a growing trend of activist cases successfully being won in global courts. The 2017 UN Litigation Report identified 884 cases in 24 countries, including 654 cases in the United States and 230 cases in all other countries combined. As of July 1, 2020, the number of cases has almost doubled to at least 1,550 climate change cases filed in 38 countries (39 including the courts of the European Union), with approximately 1,200 cases filed in the US and over 350 filed in all other countries combined. The number of litigation cases is expected to continue rising in the 2020s.

Types of action 
Climate litigation typically engages in one of five types of legal claims:

 Constitutional law - focused on breaches of constitutional rights by the state.
 Administrative law - challenging the merits of administrative decision making within existing on-the-books laws, such as in granting permissions for high-emissions projects.
 Private law - challenging corporations or other organizations for negligence, nuisance, trespass, public trust and unjust enrichment.
 Fraud or consumer protection - typically challenging companies for misrepresenting information about climate impacts.
 Human rights - claiming that failure to act on climate change or to protect related natural resources, such as the atmosphere or the rainforest, fails to protect human rights

By type of action

Between governments and companies 
In the United States, Friends of the Earth, Greenpeace together with the cities of Boulder, Arcata and Oakland won against the Export-Import Bank of the United States and the Overseas Private Investment Corporation (state-owned enterprises of the United States government), which were accused of financing fossil-fuel projects detrimental to a stable climate, in violation of the National Environmental Policy Act (case filed in 2002 and settled in 2009).

In 2016, a government body of the Philippines (the Commission on Human Rights) launched an official investigation concerning climate change against 47 of the world's largest carbon producers. It found that in 2019 fossil fuel companies have a legal obligation to act against climate change and may be held responsible for damages.

In 2017, Saul Luciano Lliuya sued RWE to protect his hometown of Huaraz from a swollen glacier lake at risk of overflowing.

In 2017, San Francisco, Oakland and other California coastal communities sued multiple fossil-fuel companies for rising sea levels.

In 2018, the city of New York announced that it is taking five fossil fuel firms (BP, ExxonMobil, Chevron, ConocoPhillips and Shell) to federal court due to their contribution to climate change (from which the city is already suffering).

In 2020, Charleston, South Carolina, followed a similar strategy.

Legislation against activists

By country

Australia 
As of February 2020, Australia had the second most number of cases pending in the world, with almost 200 cases.
Cases in Australia include Torres Strait Islanders v. Australia (2019), in which the United Nations Human Rights Committee found that the Australian government had violated the Islanders' human rights by failure to act on climate change, Youth Verdict v. Waratah Coal (2020), and Sharma v. Minister for the Environment (2020), in which eight young people unsuccessfully argued for an injunction against the expansion of a Whitehaven coal mine.

Belgium 
In June 2021, after a six year long legal battle, the Court of First Instance ruled that the climate targets of the government of Belgium are too low and therefore "breached the right to life (article 2) and the right to respect for private and family life (article 8)" of the European Convention on Human Rights.

France

Germany 
In 2021, Germany's supreme constitutional court ruled in Neubauer v. Germany that the government's climate protection measures are insufficient to protect future generations and that the government had until the end of 2022 to improve its Climate Protection Act.

Republic of Ireland 

In July 2020, Friends of the Irish Environment won a landmark case against the Irish government for failing to take sufficient action to address the climate and ecological crisis. The Supreme Court of Ireland ruled that the Irish government's 2017 National Mitigation Plan was inadequate, specifying that it did not provide enough detail on how it would reduce greenhouse gas emissions.

Netherlands 

The Netherlands had committed to reducing its carbon dioxide emissions from 1990 levels by 49% by 2030 with various intermediate targets. However, the Dutch Environmental Assessment Agency determined that the country would be missing its goals for 2020.

In 2012, the Dutch lawyer Roger Cox gave the idea of judicial intervention to force action against climate change. In 2013, the Urgenda Foundation, with 900 co-plaintiffs, has filed a lawsuit against the Government of the Netherlands "for not taking sufficient measures to reduce greenhouse gas emissions that cause dangerous climate change".

In 2015, the District Court of The Hague ruled that the government of the Netherlands must do more to reduce greenhouse gas emissions to protect its citizens from climate change (Urgenda climate case). It was described as a "precedent-setting judgment" and as the "world’s first climate liability suit".

According to James Thornton, chief executive of Client Earth, "Most remarkably, it is based in essence on established science and the ancient principle of a government's duty of care. That reasoning is applicable in any legal system and will certainly be used by courts in other countries." In 2018, a court of appeal in The Hague has upheld the precedent-setting judgment that forces the Dutch government to step up its efforts to curb greenhouse-gas emissions in the Netherlands.

In December 2019, the Supreme Court of the Netherlands upheld the ruling on appeal. Thus, affirming that the government must cut carbon dioxide emissions by 25% from 1990 levels by the end of 2020, on the basis that climate change poses a risk to human health.

In Milieudefensie et al v Royal Dutch Shell, decided in May 2021, the district court of The Hague ordered Royal Dutch Shell to cut its global carbon emissions by 45% by the end of 2030 compared to 2019 levels, and affirmed the responsibility of the company for scope 3 emissions, e.g., emissions from suppliers and customers of its products.

Turkey 
In 2022 several environmental organizations filed over 30 lawsuits requesting the president shutdown many large coal-fired power stations and over 600 mines. In addition to climate change arguments the plaintiffs allege that cancer cases are increased and the COVID-19 pandemic was worsened by their air pollution. They argue that as the constitution says that the country cannot be divided this also means that it is unconstitutional to damage the country, and also that because of their social cost they violate the presidents duty to maintain national security. The constitution also says (article 56) that "Everyone has the right to live in a healthy and balanced environment. It is the duty of the State and citizens to improve the natural environment, to protect the environmental health and to prevent environmental pollution." Turkey has ratified the Paris Agreement and says that greenhouse gas emissions will be net zero by 2053, but the government has no plan to phase out coal power.

Government lawyers initially asked for the case to be dismissed by saying that the president does not have the authority to shut down power plants, but the plaintiffs argued that since the constitution had been changed from a parliamentary to a presidential system he does have that authority.

United Kingdom 
In December 2020, three British citizens, Marina Tricks, Adetola Onamade, Jerry Amokwandoh, and the climate litigation charity, Plan B, announced that they were taking legal action against the UK government for failing to take sufficient action to address the climate and ecological crisis. The plaintiffs announced that they will allege that the government's ongoing funding of fossil fuels both in the UK and other countries constitute a violation of their rights to life and to family life, as well as violating the Paris Agreement and the UK Climate Change Act of 2008.

In 2022, it was claimed in McGaughey and Davies v Universities Superannuation Scheme Ltd that the directors of the UK's largest pension fund, USS Ltd had breached their duty to act for proper purposes under the Companies Act 2006 section 171, by failing to have a plan to divest fossil fuels from the fund's portfolio. The claim did not succeed in the High Court, and the claimants appealed to the Court of Appeal, being granted permission for a June 2023 hearing. The case alleges that the right to life must be used to interpret duties in company law, and that because fossil fuels must cease to exist, any investments using them pose a "risk of significant financial detriment".

In February 2023, ClientEarth filed a derivative action claim against Shell's board of directors for putting the company at risk by not transitioning away from fossil fuels quickly enough. ClientEarth said the lawsuit marked 'the first time ever that a company’s board has been challenged on its failure to properly prepare for the energy transition.'

United States 

As of February 2020, the U.S. had the most pending cases with over 1000 in the court system. Examples include Connecticut v. ExxonMobil Corp. and Massachusetts v. Environmental Protection Agency. In the United States climate change litigation addresses existing principal laws to make their claim, most of them focusing on private and administrative law. The most popular principal laws to use are NEPA (the National Environmental Policy Act), with 322 cases filed under its jurisdiction, the Clean Air Act, with 215 cases filed under its jurisdiction, the Endangered Species Act, with 163 cases filed under its jurisdiction. As more efforts continue on the front of climate change, as of August 2022, the federal government continues to approve agreements and class actions in terms of additional climate change initiatives. In addition, since 2015, there are about two dozen liability and fraud cases brought against some of the world's largest oil companies by various states for their role in denying climate policy leading to increased risks and costs borne to state governments. These states include New Jersey, District of Columbia, Delaware, Connecticut, Minnesota, Rhode Island, Massachusetts, and Vermont. Like Minnesota and the District of Columbia before it, New Jersey has also included the industry’s top US trade group, the American Petroleum Institute in addition to ExxonMobil, Shell Oil, Chevron, BP and ConocoPhillips.

Actions Using the Endangered Species Act 
In the Endangered Species Act (ESA) case, Tennessee Valley Authority v. Hill, the Supreme Court stated that the ESA mandates federal agencies to insure their actions do not jeopardize any species that are listed as endangered in the ESA. As climate change is a large threat to endangered species, climate activists have been able to use the ESA to target those accelerating climate change. Climate change litigation cases that use the ESA  primarily focus on articles 7 and 9 of the statue. Article 7 states that all actions carried out by federal agencies must be unlikely to jeopardize the continued existence or result in the destruction of endangered species. Article 9 focuses not just on federal agencies but everybody, banning the taking of any endangered species by any party, be it federal, state, or private. By proving that actions taken by those who are contributing to climate change jeopardize animals listed on the ESA, climate activists are able to use the ESA to stop actions contributing to climate change.

The first step for climate change activists is to make sure that species threatened by climate change are listed on the ESA by the Fish and Wildlife Service (FWS). Oftentimes this alone can be a lengthy process. In December 2005 the Center for Biological Diversity joined with two other US NGOs (Greenpeace and the Natural Resources Defense Council) to petition that the Arctic Polar Bear be listed on the ESA. The FWS under the Bush administration stretched the process out for years, missing many key deadlines and listing the species as "threatened" instead of endangered while the science was clearly in favor of an endangered listing. Facing mass public pressure and scientific consensus the FWS officially listed the species as endangered in May 2008.

Actions Using the National Environmental Policy Act 
The National Environmental Policy Act (NEPA) recognizes that actions taken by the US government can have significant environmental impact and requires that all federal agencies consider these environmental implications when doing "major federal actions". This can be done either through an environmental assessment (EA) or a more thorough environmental impact statement (EIS), how thorough the analyzation has to be depends on the nature of the proposed action. NEPA does not require climate change or greenhouse gases be mentioned in all EAs and EISs, but many climate change activists will sue under NEPA claiming that the impacts related to climate change are relevant enough that they should be included.

Actions Using the Clear Air Act 
The Clean Air Act (CAA) regulates air pollutants both from stationary and mobile sources. The Act was passed in the 1970s before there was widespread knowledge about greenhouse gases (GHGs) but in 2007 the Supreme Court decided the EPA did have to regulate GHGs under the CAA due to the famous Massachusetts vs. The EPA case. As a result of this, climate change activists are able to use the CAA as a means to combat GHG emissions in order to fight the acceleration of climate change.

In 2009 the state of California was able to use the CAA to create stronger vehicle emission standards than the national standard, which quickly led to the Obama administration adopting these stricter emission standards on a national level. These standards were called the Corporate Average Fuel Efficiency (CAFE) standards and included regulations of GHGs.

Massachusetts v. EPA 

One of the first landmark climate change litigation cases was Massachusetts v. Environmental Protection Agency, decided by the Supreme Court of the United States in 2007. The suit was brought by several American states against the Environmental Protection Agency (EPA) after the EPA declined to regulate carbon dioxide and other greenhouse gas emissions as part of their duty under the Clean Air Act (CAA) in 2003. The EPA had argued that their authority under the Clean Air Act were to regulate "air pollutants", which they claimed carbon dioxide and other greenhouse gases did not fall under, so could not apply regulations. States, like Massachusetts, argued that these emissions could lead to climate change-related damages to their states, such as through rising ocean levels, and thus these emissions should be seen as harmful under the CAA and within the EPA's ability to regulate. While EPA initially won at the Court of Appeals, the Supreme Court, on a 5–4 decision, agreed with the states that carbon dioxide and other greenhouse gases had been shown to be harmful, and required the EPA to regulate them.

Juliana v. United States 

In 2015, a number of American youth, represented by Our Children's Trust, filed a lawsuit against the United States government in 2015, contending that their future lives would be harmed due to the government's inactivity towards mitigating climate change. While similar suits had been filed and dismissed by the courts for numerous reasons, Juliana v. United States gained traction when a District Judge Ann Aiken ruled that the case had merit to continue, and that "a climate system capable of sustaining human life" was a fundamental right under the United States Constitution. The United States government has since attempted to dismiss the case through various challenges to Aiken's findings, but it remains pending in court actions.

European Court of Human Rights 

In September 2019, a group of six children and young adults from Portugal filed a lawsuit at the European Court of Human Rights. Supported by the British NGO Global Legal Action Network (GLAN), they argue that tougher climate action is needed to safeguard their future physical and mental well-being. The court asked 33 European governments to explain by February 2021 whether their failure to tackle global heating violates Article 3 of the European Convention on Human Rights.

Others 
After the landmark ruling of the Netherlands in 2015, groups in other countries tried the same judicial approach. For instance, groups went to court in order to protect people from climate change in Brazil, Belgium, India, New Zealand, Norway, South Africa, Switzerland and the United States.

In Pakistan in 2015 Lahore High Court ruled in Asghar Leghari vs. Federation of Pakistan that the government was violating the National Climate Change Policy of 2012 and the Framework for Implementation of Climate Change Policy (2014-2030) by failing to meet goals set by the policies. In response, a Climate Change Commission was required to be formed in order to help Pakistan meet its climate goals. The case is considered significant in the history of human rights-based climate litigation.

In 2018, ten families from European countries, Kenya and Fiji filed a suit against the European Union for the threats against their homes caused by the EU greenhouse emissions.

A group of children in Colombia sued the government to protect the Amazon rainforest from deforestation due to the deforestation's contribution to climate change. In 2018, the Supreme Court ruled that the Colombian rainforest was an "entity subject of rights" requiring protection and restoration.

In 2020, an administrative court case in France, required the Macron administration to review their policies to address climate change to make sure they were significant enough to meet Paris Agreement commitments.

See also 

 Environmental law
 Human rights and climate change
 Oslo Principles on Global Obligations to Reduce Climate Change

References

External links
Climate Change Litigation Databases, database by the Sabin Centre for Climate Change Law at Columbia Law School
The UCS Science Hub for Climate Litigation, one aggregation of litigation-relevant resources
Litigation Cases, database by the LSE Grantham Research Institute on Climate Change and the Environment

Climate change law
Climate change
Environmental case law